Shoreline is a city in King County, Washington, United States. As of the 2020 census, the population of Shoreline was 58,608, making it the 22nd largest city in the state. Based on per capita income, one of the more reliable measures of affluence, Shoreline ranks 91st of 522 areas in the state of Washington to be ranked.

History
Shoreline began in 1890 with the platting of the neighborhood of Richmond Beach, on Puget Sound, in anticipation of the arrival of the Great Northern Railway the next year. Over the next two decades, Shoreline was connected to Seattle via the Seattle-Everett Interurban streetcar line (1906) and North Trunk Road (now Aurora Avenue N., State Route 99) (1913), helping to increase its population.

The name "Shoreline" was applied to this stretch of unincorporated King County in 1944 when it was given to the school district, since the school district boundaries stretched from "Shore to Shore" (Puget Sound to Lake Washington) and "Line to Line" (the old Seattle city limit of 85th St to the Snohomish County Line). Though the modern borders of the city do not stretch to Lake Washington, the area has kept the "Shoreline" name.

After the incorporation of Lake Forest Park in 1961, the remainder of the Shoreline School District remained an unincorporated portion of King County. The school district remained the main identifier for the area for several decades; a set of welcome signs were installed in 1983 by the Shoreline Chamber of Commerce bearing the name. The City of Seattle began studying an annexation of the area in 1988, causing local residents to organize an incorporation measure to retain their separate school system. A half-century after it had been named, on August 31, 1995, Shoreline was officially incorporated as a code city, and it adopted the council–manager form of government.

Police
Shoreline contracts with the King County Sheriff's Office for police services. Deputies assigned to Shoreline wear city uniforms and drive patrol cars marked with the city logo. As of 2012, there are 52 full-time employees assigned to the Shoreline Police Department. The Shoreline Police Department has a burglary/larceny unit, traffic unit, and a street crimes unit.

Geography
Shoreline is located at  (47.756519, -122.339657).

The city of Shoreline also contains a gated community, The Highlands, which manages its utilities separately from Shoreline.

Boeing Creek and Shoreview Park, which abuts Shoreline Community College, contains Boeing Creek, flowing on its way to Hidden Lake and Puget Sound.

Demographics

2010 census
As of the census of 2010, there were 53,007 people, 21,561 households, and 13,168 families living in the city. The racial makeup of the city was 71.4% White, 5.0% African American, 0.8% Native American, 15.2% Asian, 0.3% Pacific Islander, 2.2% from other races, and 5.1% from two or more races. Hispanic or Latino of any race were 6.6% of the population.

There were 21,561 households, of which 27.9% had children under the age of 18 living with them, 46.4% were married couples living together, 10.3% had a female householder with no husband present, 4.4% had a male householder with no wife present, and 38.9% were non-families. 29.7% of all households were made up of individuals, and 10.4% had someone living alone who was 65 years of age or older. The average household size was 2.39 and the average family size was 2.96.

The median age in the city was 42.1 years. 19.1% of residents were under the age of 18; 8.2% were between the ages of 18 and 24; 26.7% were from 25 to 44; 30.9% were from 45 to 64; and 15.2% were 65 years of age or older. The gender makeup of the city was 48.7% male and 51.3% female.

2000 census
As of the census of 2000, there were 53,025 people, 20,716 households, and 13,486 families living in the city. The racial makeup of the city was 76.99% White, 2.77% African American, 0.91% Native American, 13.23% Asian, 0.32% Pacific Islander, 1.51% from other races, and 4.27% from two or more races. Hispanic or Latino of any race were 3.87% of the population.

There were 20,716 households, out of which 30.6% had children under the age of 18 living with them, 51.2% were married couples living together, 10.0% had a female householder with no husband present, and 34.9% were non-families. 26.4% of all households were made up of individuals, and 9.1% had someone living alone who was 65 years of age or older. The average household size was 2.50 and the average family size was 3.03.

In the city, the population was spread out, with 22.5% under the age of 18, 7.7% from 18 to 24, 30.4% from 25 to 44, 24.8% from 45 to 64, and 14.5% who were 65 years of age or older. The median age was 39 years. For every 100 females, there were 93.2 males. For every 100 females age 18 and over, there were 90.1 males.

The median income for a household in the city was $51,658, and the median income for a family was $61,450. Males had a median income of $40,955 versus $33,165 for females. The per capita income for the city was $24,959. About 4.4% of families and 6.9% of the population were below the poverty line, including 6.1% of those under age 18 and 7.3% of those age 65 or over.

Politics

As a close-in suburb of Seattle, Shoreline's politics lean to the left. In recent years, its voting habits - as well as those of neighboring Lake Forest Park - have become even more similar to those of Seattle, overwhelmingly in support of Democratic politicians.

Neighborhoods
Shoreline is divided into 14 neighborhoods, according to the city government's designation. The neighborhood boundaries have been laid out more-or-less rectangularly according to street maps, rather than following socioeconomic or natural boundaries.

The city maintains a council of neighborhoods, with the intent of bringing together community leaders from each of the neighborhoods for discussions and coordination of city programs that affect the neighborhoods.

If its offer to annex Point Wells is accepted by the developer, Shoreline will extend into south Snohomish County. As of 2020, The Shoreline city government and  Woodway government have discussed plans for subarea policies and development regulations in the event of annexation of Point Wells by either Shoreline or Woodway. The governments of both of the urban areas have taken steps to update their plans in accordance to their joint committee.

City landmarks
The City of Shoreline has designated the following landmarks:

In addition, the city designates the following "community landmark":

Economy
Companies and organizations based in Shoreline include Crista Ministries.

Points of interest
 Hamlin Park
 Kruckeberg Botanic Garden
 Shoreline Historical Museum
 Shoreline Stadium
 Boeing Creek and Shoreview Park
 Richmond Beach Saltwater Park
 Shoreline Community College

Sister city
  Boryeong, South Chungcheong, South Korea (since 2002)

Education

School districts
 Shoreline School District
 Shorewood High School
 Shorecrest High School

Private schools
 King's Schools
 Shoreline Christian School
 The Evergreen School

Colleges
 Shoreline Community College

References

External links
 City website

 
Cities in Washington (state)
Cities in King County, Washington
Cities in the Seattle metropolitan area
Populated places established in 1890
1890 establishments in Washington (state)
Populated places on Puget Sound